99-1 is a British television crime thriller series, first broadcast on 5 January 1994, that ran for a total of two series on ITV. The series starred Leslie Grantham as Mick Raynor, a maverick undercover policeman tasked with taking down some of the country's most dangerous criminals. The first series co-starred Robert Stephens as Raynor's commander, Oakwood. For the second series, Stephens was replaced by Frances Tomelty as Commander Stone. Other significant roles in the series fell to Adie Allen, Niall Buggy and Danny Webb, with Constantine Gregory also joining the cast in 1995.

The series was created by multi-award-winning playwright Terry Johnson, alongside Steve Clark-Hall and Barbara Cox. Johnson also directed two episodes of the first series. A total of fourteen episodes were produced, with the final episode being broadcast on 23 February 1995. After initially being released on VHS, the first series was released on DVD on 14 February 2011. The second and final series swiftly followed on 22 August 2011. Despite critical acclaim and a high level of viewership, a third series was never commissioned by the network.

Cast
 Leslie Grantham as Mick Raynor; a disgraced former detective inspector
 Adie Allen as Liz Hulley; detective constable and close friend of Raynor
 Niall Buggy as Elbow; police informant and one of Raynor's closest friends
 Danny Webb as Gerry McCarthy; a well connected drug dealer
 Robert Stephens as Oakwood; Raynor's commander (1.1 – 2.1)
 Frances Tomelty as Stone; Raynor's commander (2.1 – 2.8)
 Gwyneth Strong as Charlotte Raynor; Mick's estranged wife (1.1 – 1.6)
 Andrew Tiernan as Billy Pink; a contract killer (1.1 – 1.6)
 Malcolm Storry as Travis; detective superintendent (1.1 – 1.3)
 Robert Carlyle as Trevor Preston; detective constable (1.1)
 Constantine Gregory as Sir Marcus Hinchcliffe (2.2 – 2.8)
 John Hallam as Mark Wise (2.4 – 2.8)
 Timothy Block as Alberston (2.2 – 2.8)

Episodes

Series 1 (1994)

Series 2 (1995)

References

External links
 

1994 British television series debuts
1995 British television series endings
1990s British crime drama television series
ITV television dramas
Carlton Television
Crime thriller television series
Espionage television series
Television series by ITV Studios
English-language television shows
Television shows set in London